A vlei  is a shallow minor lake, mostly of a seasonal or intermittent nature. It even might refer to seasonal ponds or marshy patches where frogs and similar marsh dwellers breed. Commonly, vleis vary in their extent, or even in the presence or absence of water, according to the fall of rain or dryness of the season. In terms of water salinity, vleis may be freshwater, saltwater, or brackish. Over time a vlei may degrade into a salt pan or clay pan, such as Dead Vlei or Sossusvlei.
Ecoregions

Ecology 
Vleis of various types can be of considerable local ecological importance, harboring many endemic and migratory species.

Most vleis are too minor to be granted recognition in the form of a name. However, some major vleis are accorded names, for example Rondevlei and Zeekoevlei in the Cape Peninsula, which are permanent bodies of water. Indeed, Rondevlei is home to hippopotamus.

The term is the basis of various biological common names, such as
 vlei rat, rodents in the genus Otomys 
 vleiroos (literally "marsh rose") 
 vleikuiken (literally "vlei chick")
 vlei frog.

Etymology 
The word  is used predominantly in South Africa. It is an Afrikaans word derived from the Middle Dutch word for "valley". In Afrikaans, however, its meaning changed into that of the shallow lake.

References

 
Intermittent lakes
Afrikaans words and phrases